Oenopota impressa is a species of sea snail, a marine gastropod mollusk in the family Mangeliidae.

Pleurotoma impressa Mørch, 1869 is the type species of Nodotoma Bartsch, 1941

Description
The length of the shell varies between 6 mm and 14 mm.

The wide shell has a short spire and sloping but rather well-defined shoulder. It is densely costulate longitudinally, crossed by about ten spiral riblets, forming a cancellated surface. Its color is a yellowish ash.

Distribution
This species occurs in European waters and in the Northwest Atlantic Ocean (Spitzbergen, Nova Zembla); in the Arctic Ocean, near the Seahorse Islands, south to the Aleutians and eastward to St. Paul, Kodiak Island, Alaska.

References

 Mørch, Moll. Spitzb., No. 31 ; Ann. Soc. Mal. Belg., iv, 21, 1869
 Brunel, P., L. Bosse, and G. Lamarche. 1998. Catalogue of the marine invertebrates of the estuary and Gulf of St. Lawrence. Canadian Special Publication of Fisheries and Aquatic Sciences, 126. 405 p.
 Gofas, S.; Le Renard, J.; Bouchet, P. (2001). Mollusca, in: Costello, M.J. et al. (Ed.) (2001). European register of marine species: a check-list of the marine species in Europe and a bibliography of guides to their identification. Collection Patrimoines Naturels, 50: pp. 180–213

External links
 Dall (1919) Descriptions of new species of Mollusca from the North Pacific Ocean; Proceedings of the U.S. National Museum, vol. 56 (1920) 
 Verrill A. E. (1880–1881). Notice of recent addition to the marine Invertebrata of the northeastern coast of America, with descriptions of new genera and species and critical remarks on others. Part II - Mollusca, with notes on Annelida, Echinodermata, etc, collected by the United States Fish Commission. Proceedings of the United States National Museum, 3: 356–409
  Tucker, J.K. 2004 Catalog of recent and fossil turrids (Mollusca: Gastropoda). Zootaxa 682:1–1295.
 
 Biolib.cz: Oenopota impressa

impressa
Gastropods described in 1869